The Islands of Turku consist of islands belonging to the Finnish city of Turku. There are dozens of islands and skerries, of which four have significant amounts of permanent inhabitants:

 Ruissalo/Runsala
 Hirvensalo
 Kakskerta
 Satava

See also
 Archipelago Sea

External links 
 
 The Archipelago of Finland – Turku Archipelago Tourist Association

Turku
Finnish islands in the Baltic
Landforms of Southwest Finland
Archipelagoes of the Baltic Sea
Archipelagoes of Finland